"He Thinks He'll Keep Her" is a song co-written and recorded by American country music artist Mary Chapin Carpenter.  It was released in December 1993 as the sixth single from the album Come On Come On.  The song peaked at No. 2 on the Billboard Hot Country Songs chart. It was written by Carpenter and Don Schlitz.

The song was nominated for the Grammy Award for Record of the Year, and was accompanied by a live performance music video, taken from the 1993 CBS special Women of Country, where Carpenter was accompanied by Emmylou Harris, Kathy Mattea, Patty Loveless, Trisha Yearwood, Suzy Bogguss and Pam Tillis.

Composition
In a 1992 interview with the Chicago Tribune, Carpenter stated that the song's title was inspired by a 1970s Geritol TV commercial in which a man points to his wife’s many accomplishments and attributes, and then concludes with "My wife...I think I'll keep her". The song describes the life of a woman who marries at age 21 and has three children by the age of 29; over the following few years, she begins to realize that she's dissatisfied with her life. At age 36, the wife informs her husband that "I'm sorry, I don't love you anymore" and leaves him. In the chorus's bridge, Carpenter describes the housewife's having worked for 15 years without a raise, and now has a minimum-wage job in an office typing pool. Music critic David Browne, writing for Entertainment Weekly, observed that the song's subject tied into a recurring theme on Come On, Come On of "women caught between tradition and contemporary roles who realize that the solution lies with their own inner resolve".

The song's backing vocals have been compared to a metronome, regarded as a reference to the lyric "Everything runs right on time" in the refrain. Its instrumentation has been described as "standard" and similar to that of many other country songs of the time, with steel guitars and keyboards.

Personnel
Credits are adapted from the liner notes of Come On Come On.
Mary Chapin Carpenter – vocals, acoustic guitar
Bob Glaub – bass guitar
John Jennings – electric guitar, background vocals
John Jorgenson – electric guitar
Andy Newmark – drums
Matt Rollings – piano
Benmont Tench – Hammond organ

Music video
The music video – a live performance of the song with backing vocals by Emmylou Harris, Trisha Yearwood, Patty Loveless, Pam Tillis, Kathy Mattea and Suzy Bogguss, taken from the 1993 CBS television special Women of Country – was directed by Bud Schaetzle, and premiered in early 1994.

Reception

Commercial
The single became Carpenter's sixth top ten hit on the Billboard Hot Country Songs chart, peaking at number two on the chart dated March 26, 1994. It spent twenty weeks on the chart, and tied with "Down at the Twist and Shout" for her highest-peaking single at the time, matched a few weeks later (May 1, 1994) by "I Take My Chances", and surpassed later that year (November 18, 1994), when her "Shut Up and Kiss Me" reached number one.

The single became Carpenter's fifth top ten hit on the Billboard Country Airplay chart, where it peaked at number two the same month. It also became, following "Down at the Twist and Shout", her second song to peak at number two on that chart as well. 

The single was placed at number sixteen on Billboards year-end Hot Country Songs chart in 1994.

Chart positions

Year-end charts

References

1993 singles
Mary Chapin Carpenter songs
Emmylou Harris songs
Kathy Mattea songs
Patty Loveless songs
Trisha Yearwood songs
Suzy Bogguss songs
Pam Tillis songs
Songs with feminist themes
Songs written by Don Schlitz
Songs written by Mary Chapin Carpenter
Columbia Nashville Records singles
1992 songs